George Wingerter (September 4, 1904 in Brooklyn, New York – August 20, 1994 in Denison, Texas) was an American racecar driver.

Indy 500 results

References

Indianapolis 500 drivers
1904 births
1994 deaths
Racing drivers from New York City
Sportspeople from Brooklyn